Puna Himene Te Rangimarie (fl. 1908–1911) was a New Zealand healer, nurse and spiritual leader. Of Māori descent, nothing is known of her early life. She was a spiritual healer who came into conflict with the authorities. Despite intensive lobbying of the native minister, James Carroll, she was prosecuted for her spiritual healing.

References

1911 deaths
New Zealand nurses
New Zealand Māori religious leaders
New Zealand Māori nurses
Year of birth missing
New Zealand women nurses